Mustapha Fahim (1938 – 2005) was a Moroccan footballer. He competed in the men's tournament at the 1964 Summer Olympics.

References

External links
 

1938 births
2005 deaths
Moroccan footballers
Morocco international footballers
Olympic footballers of Morocco
Footballers at the 1964 Summer Olympics
Place of birth missing
Association football defenders
Botola players
Wydad AC players